Sarah Williams (1828-1861) was an English historian.

Williams is best known for her edition of the letters of John Chamberlain published by the Camden Society in 1861 after her death. Williams died of consumption.

Works
 Letters written by John Chamberlain during the reign of Queen Elizabeth (London: Camden Society, 1861).

References

1828 births
1861 deaths
19th-century English historians
British women historians